Adorea is a genus of leaf beetles in the subfamily Eumolpinae. It contains seven species, which are found in Central America and northern South America.

Species
The genus contains seven species:
 Adorea bifasciata (Jacoby, 1881) – Panama
 Adorea chontalensis (Jacoby, 1881) – Nicarauga
 Adorea cruentata (Lefèvre, 1877) – Guatemala, Colombia, Venezuela
 Adorea elegans (Jacoby, 1878) – Colombia, Ecuador
 Adorea splendida (Jacoby, 1881) – Costa Rica, Panama
 Adorea speciosa Lefèvre, 1877 – Ecuador
 Adorea strongylioides (Bechyné, 1950) – Costa Rica

References

Eumolpinae
Chrysomelidae genera
Beetles of Central America
Beetles of South America
Taxa named by Édouard Lefèvre